Synecdoche, New York (pronounced ) is a 2008 American postmodern psychological drama film written and directed by Charlie Kaufman in his directorial debut. It stars Philip Seymour Hoffman as an ailing theater director who works on an increasingly elaborate stage production and whose extreme commitment to realism begins to blur the boundaries between fiction and reality. The film's title is a play on Schenectady, New York, where much of the film is set, and the concept of synecdoche, wherein a part of something represents the whole or vice versa.

The film premiered in competition at the 61st Annual Cannes Film Festival on May 23, 2008. Sony Pictures Classics acquired the United States distribution rights, paying no money but agreeing to give the film's backers a portion of the revenues. It had a limited theatrical release in the U.S. on October 24, 2008, and was a commercial failure on its initial release.

The story and themes of Synecdoche, New York polarized critics: some called it pretentious or self-indulgent, but others declared it a masterpiece, with Roger Ebert ranking it as the decade's best. The film was also nominated for the Palme d'Or at the 2008 Cannes Film Festival, and has since appeared in multiple polls of the greatest films of the 21st century.

Plot
Theater director Caden Cotard finds his life unraveling. He suffers from numerous physical ailments and has been growing increasingly alienated from his artist wife, Adele. He hits bottom when Adele leaves him for a new life in Berlin, taking their four-year-old daughter, Olive, with her.

After the success of his production of Death of a Salesman, Caden unexpectedly receives a MacArthur Fellowship, giving him the financial means to pursue his artistic interests. He determines to use it to create an artistic piece of brutal realism and honesty, into which he can pour his whole self. Gathering an ensemble cast into an enormous warehouse in Manhattan's Theater District, he directs a celebration of the mundane, instructing the cast to live out their constructed lives. As the mockup inside the warehouse grows increasingly mimetic of the city outside, Caden continues to seek solutions to his personal crises. He is traumatized as he discovers Adele has become a celebrated painter in Berlin and Olive is growing up under the questionable guidance of Adele's friend Maria. After a failed attempt at a fling with Hazel (the woman who works in the box office), he marries Claire, an actress in his cast, and has a daughter with her. Their relationship fails, and he continues his awkward relationship with Hazel, who is now married with children and working as his assistant. Meanwhile, an unknown condition is systematically shutting down his autonomic nervous system.

As the years rapidly pass, the continually expanding warehouse is isolated from the deterioration of the city outside. Caden buries himself ever deeper into his magnum opus, blurring the line between reality and the world of the play by populating the cast and crew with doppelgängers. For instance, Sammy Barnathan is cast in the role of Caden in the play after Sammy reveals that he has been obsessively following Caden for 20 years, while Sammy's lookalike is cast as Sammy. Sammy's interest in Hazel sparks a revival of Caden's relationship with her, leading Sammy to commit suicide.

As he pushes against the limits of his personal and professional relationships, Caden lets an actress take over his role as director and takes on her previous role as Ellen, Adele's custodian. He lives out his days in the model of Adele's apartment under the replacement director's instruction while some unexplained calamity occurs in the warehouse leaving ruins and bodies in its wake. Finally, he prepares for death as he rests his head on the shoulder of an actress who had previously played Ellen's mother, seemingly the only person in the warehouse still alive. As the scene fades to gray, Caden begins to say that now he has an idea of how to do the play, when the director's voice in his ear cuts him off with his final cue: "Die."

Cast

Production
Sony Pictures Classics approached Kaufman and Spike Jonze about making a horror film. The two began working on a film dealing with things they found frightening in real life rather than typical horror-film tropes. This project evolved into Synecdoche. Jonze was slated to direct but chose to direct Where the Wild Things Are instead.

Motifs

The burning house

Early in the film, Hazel buys a house that is perpetually on fire. At first showing reluctance to buy it, Hazel remarks to the real estate agent, "I like it, I do. But I'm really concerned about dying in the fire," to which the agent responds, "It's a big decision, how one prefers to die." In an interview with Michael Guillén, Kaufman said, "Well, she made the choice to live there. In fact, she says in the scene just before she dies that the end is built into the beginning. That's exactly what happens there. She chooses to live in this house. She's afraid it's going to kill her but she stays there and it does. That is the truth about any choice that we make. We make choices that resonate throughout our lives." The burning house has been compared to Tennessee Williams's line "We all live in a house on fire, no fire department to call; no way out, just the upstairs window to look out of while the fire burns the house down with us trapped, locked in it." It has also been said that the house is a reference to Jungian psychology. In an interview, Kaufman mentioned that a Jungian scholar sees the house as a representation of the self.

The end is built into the beginning

The film continuously brings up the phrase "The end is built into the beginning", which refers to death's connection to birth. This is emphasized by how most of time is spent being not yet born or dead, and how life is a fraction of a second in comparison. Another connection to this theme is the film's starting and ending with a fade-in to a grey screen.

Miniature paintings and the impossible warehouses

Caden and Adele are artists, and the scale on which they both work becomes increasingly relevant to the story. Adele works on an extremely small scale, while Caden works on an impossibly large scale, constructing a full-size replica of New York City in a warehouse, and eventually a warehouse within that warehouse, and so on, continuing in this impossible cycle. Adele's name is almost a mondegreen for "a delicate art" (Adele Lack Cotard). Commenting on the scale of the paintings (actually the miniaturized paintings of artist Alex Kanevsky), Kaufman said, "In [Adele's] studio at the beginning of the movie you can see some small but regular-sized paintings that you could see without a magnifying glass ... By the time [Caden] goes to the gallery to look at her work, which is many years later, you can't see them at all." He continued, "As a dream image it appeals to me. Her work is in a way much more effective than Caden's work. Caden's goal in his attempt to do his sprawling theater piece is to impress Adele because he feels so lacking next to her in terms of his work", and added, "Caden's work is so literal. The only way he can reflect reality in his mind is by imitating it full-size ... It's a dream image but he's not interacting with it successfully."

Jungian psychology

Many reviewers believe Kaufman's writing is influenced by Jungian psychology. Carl Jung wrote that the waking and dream states are both necessary in the quest for meaning. Caden often appears to exist in a combination of the two. Kaufman has said, "I think the difference is that a movie that tries to be a dream has a punchline and the punchline is: it was a dream." Another concept in Jungian psychology is the four steps to self-realization: becoming conscious of the shadow (recognizing the constructive and destructive sides), of the anima and animus (where a man becomes conscious of his female component and a woman becomes conscious of her male component), of the archetypal spirit (where humans take on their mana personalities), and finally self-realization (where a person is fully aware of the ego and the self). Caden seems to go through all four stages. When he hires Sammy, he learns of his true personality and becomes more aware of himself. He shows awareness of his anima when replacing himself with Ellen and telling Tammy that his persona would have made him more adept in womanhood than in manhood. In taking on the role of Ellen, he becomes conscious of the archetypal spirit and finally realizes truths about his life and about love.

References to delusion

In the Cotard delusion, one believes oneself to be dead or that one's organs are missing or decaying. Caden's preoccupation with illness and dying seems related.

When Caden enters Adele's flat, the buzzer pressed (31Y) bears the name "Capgras". Capgras delusion is a psychiatric disorder in which sufferers perceive familiar people (spouses, siblings, friends) to have been replaced by identical imposters. This theme is echoed throughout the film as people are replaced by actors in Caden's play.

In the closing scenes of the film, Caden hears instructions by earpiece. This is similar to the auditory third-person hallucination described by Kurt Schneider as a first-rank symptom of schizophrenia.

Play within a play

The film is meta-referential in that it portrays a play within a play, sometimes also called mise en abyme. 

This theme has been compared to William Shakespeare's line "All the world’s a stage, and all the men and women merely players." It has also been compared to the music video for Icelandic singer Björk's song "Bachelorette", which portrays a woman who finds an autobiographical book about her that writes itself, which is then adapted into a play that features a play within itself. The video was directed by Michel Gondry, who also directed Kaufman's films Human Nature and Eternal Sunshine of the Spotless Mind. In an interview, Kaufman responded to the comparison, "Yeah, I heard that comparison before. The reason Michel and I found each other is because we have similar sort of ideas."

Death and decay

Throughout the film Caden refers to death's inevitability and the idea that everyone is already dead. "Practically everything in Caden's grotesque existence betokens mortality and decay," Jonathan Romney of The Independent wrote, "whether it be skin lesions, garbled fax messages or the contents of people's toilet bowls."

Simulacrum

Some reviewers have noted that the film seems inspired by postmodernist philosopher Jean Baudrillard's concept of simulacra and simulation. One of the names Caden gives his play is Simulacrum. The Guardian suggested that the film is the "ultimate postmodern novel". Baudrillard references the Jorge Luis Borges story "On Exactitude in Science" in his writings. Some commentators have compared the film's ending, when Caden is walking through his reproduction as it begins to fall apart, to the story.

Hazel's books

Hazel's books also have significance in the film. She has Marcel Proust's Swann's Way (the first volume of In Search of Lost Time) and Franz Kafka's The Trial; both are related to the film's motifs.

Critical reception
On review aggregator Rotten Tomatoes, the film has an approval rating of 69% based on 195 reviews, with an average rating of 6.80/10. The website's critical consensus reads, "Charlie Kaufman's ambitious directorial debut occasionally strains to connect, but ultimately provides fascinating insight into a writer's mind." On Metacritic, the film has a weighted average score of 67 out of 100, based on 34 critics, indicating "generally positive reviews". A number of critics have compared it to Federico Fellini's 1963 film 8½.

In his review in the Chicago Sun-Times, Roger Ebert said, "I watched it the first time and knew it was a great film [...] the subject of 'Synecdoche, New York' is nothing less than human life and how it works. Using a neurotic theater director from upstate New York, it encompasses every life and how it copes and fails. Think about it a little and, my god, it's about you.  you are." In 2009 Ebert wrote that the movie was the best of the decade. Manohla Dargis of the New York Times said, "To say that [it] is one of the best films of the year or even one closest to my heart is such a pathetic response to its soaring ambition that I might as well pack it in right now ... Despite its slippery way with time and space and narrative and Mr. Kaufman’s controlled grasp of the medium, Synecdoche, New York is as much a cry from the heart as it is an assertion of creative consciousness. It’s extravagantly conceptual but also tethered to the here and now." In the Los Angeles Times, Carina Chocano called the film "wildly ambitious ... sprawling, awe-inspiring, heartbreaking, frustrating, hard-to-follow and achingly, achingly sad."

Negative reviews mostly called the film incomprehensible, pretentious, depressing, or self-indulgent. Rex Reed, Richard Brody, and Roger Friedman, all labeled it one of the worst films of 2008. Owen Gleiberman of Entertainment Weekly gave the film a D+ and wrote, "I gave up making heads or tails of Synecdoche, New York, but I did get one message: The compulsion to stand outside of one's life and observe it to this degree isn't the mechanism of art — it's the structure of psychosis." American film critic Jonathan Rosenbaum wrote, "[I]t seems more like an illustration of his script than a full-fledged movie, proving how much he needs a Spike Jonze or a Michel Gondry to realize his surrealistic conceits."

The Moving Arts Film Journal ranked the film at No. 80 on its list of "The 100 Greatest Movies of All Time". In addition, it is the 61st-most acclaimed film of the 21st century according to review aggregator They Shoot Pictures, Don't They?

Top-ten lists
The film appeared on many critics' top-ten lists of the best films of 2008. Both Kimberly Jones and Marjorie Baumgarten of the Austin Chronicle named it the best film of the year, as did Ray Bennett of The Hollywood Reporter.

It appeared on 101 "Best of 2008" lists, with 20 of them giving it the number-one spot. Those who placed it in their top ten included Manohla Dargis of The New York Times, Richard Corliss of Time, Shawn Anthony Levy of The Oregonian, Josh Rosenblatt of the Austin Chronicle, Joe Neumaier of the New York Daily News, Ty Burr and Wesley Morris of the Boston Globe, Lou Lumenick of the New York Post, Philip Martin of the Arkansas Democrat-Gazette, Scott Foundas of LA Weekly, and Walter Chaw, Bill Chambers and Ian Pugh of Film Freak Central (all three of whom placed it at number one).

Roger Ebert of the Chicago Sun-Times named it the best film of the 2000s. In the 2012 Sight & Sound poll, four critics ranked it among the 10 greatest films of all time, and Ebert considered the film a strong contender for his own list. Also in 2012, in Time, Richard Corliss ranked it 7th on his list of the "Greatest Movies of the Millennium (Thus Far)".

In a 2016 BBC critics' poll, Synecdoche, New York was ranked the 20th-greatest film of the 21st century.

In 2019, the film ranked as No. 7 in The 100 Best Films of the 21st Century poll conducted by The Guardian.

Awards and nominations
Charlie Kaufman was nominated for the Palme d'Or at the Cannes Film Festival and the 2008 Chicago Film Critics Association Award for Best Original Screenplay.

Kaufman was awarded Best Original Screenplay by the Austin Film Critics Association and the film was placed on their Top 10 Films of the Year list.

The film won the Independent Spirit Award for Best First Feature and the Robert Altman Award at the 2008 Independent Spirit Awards ceremony; it also was nominated for the Independent Spirit Award for Best Screenplay.

At the 2008 Gotham Independent Film Awards, the film tied with Vicky Cristina Barcelona for Best Ensemble Cast.

Mark Friedberg won the 2008 Los Angeles Film Critics Association Award for Best Production Design.

The film was nominated by the Visual Effects Society Awards in the categories of "Outstanding Supporting Visual Effects in a Feature Motion Picture", "Outstanding Matte Paintings in a Feature Motion Picture", and "Outstanding Created Environment in a Feature Motion Picture".

Influence
A number of critics have compared the film to the American docu-comedy television series The Rehearsal created by Nathan Fielder.

See also
 Anomie
 Map–territory relation
 Droste effect

References

External links
 
 
 
 
 
 
 
 Gary J. Shipley, The Strangeness of Realism vs. the Realism of the Strange: Themes in Synecdoche, New York, SCRIPT 1.2 (April 30, 2013)

2008 films
2008 comedy-drama films
American comedy-drama films
American independent films
2000s English-language films
Existentialist films
Films about depression
Films directed by Charlie Kaufman
Films scored by Jon Brion
Films shot in New York City
Films set in New York City
Films set in the 2000s
Postmodern films
Films with screenplays by Charlie Kaufman
Self-reflexive films
Sidney Kimmel Entertainment films
Sony Pictures Classics films
2008 directorial debut films
2008 comedy films
2008 drama films
2008 independent films
Transgender-related films
2008 LGBT-related films
2000s American films